Pluchea obovata is a species of flowering plant in the family Asteraceae. It is endemic to Yemen. Its natural habitat is rocky areas.

References

obovata
Endemic flora of Socotra
Vulnerable plants
Taxonomy articles created by Polbot
Taxa named by Isaac Bayley Balfour